Parliamentary elections were held in the Comoros on 8 and 15 December 1978, following the adoption of a new constitution in a referendum in October. All candidates ran as independents. Following the election, Salim Ben Ali was appointed Prime Minister on 22 December, and a government was formed on 28 December.

Electoral system
The election was held using the two-round system in 38 single-member constituencies; 18 on Grande Comore, 15 on Anjouan and 5 on Mohéli, each of which elected a single member.

Results
Of the 38 members elected, 35 were civil servants, two were farmers and one was a tradesman.

References

Non-partisan elections
Elections in the Comoros
Legislative election
Comoros
Comoros